Baculonistria is a genus of phasmids belonging to the family Phasmatidae, with records from China.

Species
Baculonistria includes the following species:
Baculonistria alba  - type species
Baculonistria chinensis 
Baculonistria magna

References

Phasmatidae